Plectromerus exis is a species of beetle in the family Cerambycidae. It was described by Zayas in 1975.

It has been found in Cuba, the Dominican Republic, and Jamaica.

It's holotype is in the Fernando de Zayas Collection in Havana.

References

External links
Figure 5 c is of the P. exis holotype.

Cerambycinae
Beetles described in 1975